Magi: The Labyrinth of Magic is a Japanese manga series written and illustrated by Shinobu Ohtaka. It began serialization in Shogakukan's Weekly Shōnen Sunday magazine on June 3, 2009. The first tankōbon volume was released on December 18, 2009; 37 volumes have been published as of November 2017. All chapters of the manga and episodes of the anime series are labelled as "Nights" in an allusion to the tales of the One Thousand and One Nights which served as a primary source of inspiration to the story.

A 70-page sidestory called Magi: Adventure of Sinbad was released as an additional material with the first volume of the anime series. It was later expanded into a regular series, which began serializing in Weekly Shōnen Sunday in May 2013, and later was moved to Shogakukan's webcomic site Ura Sunday. It is written by Shinobu Ohtaka and illustrated by Yoshifumi Ohtera, though in a similar style to Ohtaka's. It follows the origins of the main character Sinbad, from his childhood in the Parthevia Empire to his rise as the king of Sindria.

The series is licensed for English language release in North America by Viz Media, who published the first volume on August 13, 2013.


Volume list

References

Magi: The Labyrinth of Magic